Friedrich C. Simmel (born 1970) is a German biophysicist and professor at the Technical University Munich. He is a researcher in the field of DNA nanotechnology and is best known for his work on DNA nanomachines and dynamic DNA-based systems.

Simmel received a PhD in experimental physics from the Ludwig Maximilian University of Munich in 1999. From 2000 to 2002 he was a PostDoctoral researcher at Bell Labs. He joined the faculty of the Technical University Munich as a full professor in 2007.

Awards and memberships 
 2006 Human frontier science program (HFSP) young investigator award
 2009 Vice President (2009) of the International Society of Nanoscale Science, Computation and Engineering (ISNSCE)
 2010 President (2009) of the International Society of Nanoscale Science, Computation and Engineering (ISNSCE)
 2013 Elected Member of the National Academy of Science and Technology (acatech)

References

Works
DNA-based self-assembly of chiral plasmonic nanostructures with tailored optical response, Anton Kuzyk, Robert Schreiber, Zhiyuan Fan, Günther Pardatscher, Eva-Maria Roller, Alexander Högele, Friedrich C. Simmel, Alexander O. Govorov, Tim Liedl, Nature, 483, 311-314, 2012

External links
"Friedrich C. Simmel", Scientific Commons
"Friedrich C. Simmel" , TU Munich home page
"Friedrich C. Simmel" , Article on a website run by the German Department of Education and Research (German language)

1970 births
Living people
DNA nanotechnology people
German biophysicists
21st-century German physicists
Academic staff of the Technical University of Munich